Falsagnia obenbergeri is a species of beetle in the family Cerambycidae, and the only species in the genus Falsagnia. It was described by Breuning in 1938.

References

Lamiini
Beetles described in 1938